Maxwell Montes  is a mountain massif on the planet Venus, of which a peak (Skadi Mons) is the highest point on the planet's surface.

General description 
The western slopes are very steep, whereas the eastern slopes descend gradually into Fortuna Tessera. Due to its elevation it is the coolest (about ) and least pressurised (about ) location on the surface of Venus.

Origins and geology 
The origin of the Lakshmi Planum and the mountain belts such as Maxwell Montes is controversial. One theory suggests they formed over a hot plume of material rising from the interior of the planet, while another says the region is being compressed (pushed together) from all sides, resulting in material descending into the interior of the planet. The broad ridges and valleys making up Maxwell Montes and Fortuna Tessera suggest that the topography resulted from compression. The parallel ridges and valleys were cut by later extensional faults. The extreme height of Maxwell Montes in relation to other compressional mountain ranges around Lakshmi Planum suggests that its origin is more complex.

Most of Maxwell Montes has a bright radar return which is common on Venus at high altitudes. This phenomenon is thought to result from the presence of a mineral, possibly a metallic snow. Early suggestions included pyrite and tellurium; more recently, lead sulfide and bismuth sulfide have been proposed.

Radar mapping and naming 

By using radar to probe through the permanent and thick clouds in the Venusian atmosphere and make observations of the surface, scientists at the American Arecibo Radio Telescope in Puerto Rico discovered the extensive highland on Venus that came to be called Maxwell Montes in 1967. In 1978, the space probe Pioneer Venus 1 went into orbit around Venus for the purpose of making radar observations of the Venusian surface. These observations made possible the creation of the first topographic map of the surface of Venus, and confirmed that a point within Maxwell Montes is the highest point above the average level of the planet's surface.

Maxwell Montes is named for James Clerk Maxwell whose work in mathematical physics predicted the existence of radio waves, which made radar, and thus the surface observations of Venus, possible. Maxwell Montes, Alpha Regio, and Beta Regio are the three exceptions to the rule that the surface features of Venus are to be named for females. The name, originally given by Ray Jurgens in 1970 on the urging of Tommy Gold, was approved by the International Astronomical Union's Working Group for Planetary System Nomenclature (IAU/WGPSN) between 1976 and 1979.

See also 
 List of montes on Venus
 List of tallest mountains in the Solar System

References 

Mountains on Venus
James Clerk Maxwell